Ryasna was a part of a woman’s headgear, hanging from a diadem or as a temporal pendant.

It was a sign of family's prosperity common in 11th-13th centuries in Kievan Rus’, made in the shape of a chain linking golden, silver or copper pieces, medallions, used as a suspension for a kolt or a similar pendant.

Design
Ancient Rus' ryasnas were designed to hang down from each side of the kokoshnik, reaching the woman's shoulders with the kolt reaching her chest. The design was in the form of a rain chain and the imagery portrayed always had the same theme: sky and fertile agriculture.

See also 
 Temple ring

References

External links 

 Women's Headdress in Early Rus by Sofya la Rus, Mka Lisa Kies

Kievan Rus culture
Slavic culture
Jewellery components
Archaeological artefact types